Gellért may refer to:

People
 Christian Fürchtegott Gellert (1715–1769), German poet
  (born 1961), Danish children's book illustrator
 Hugo Gellert (1892–1985), Hungarian-American illustrator and muralist
 Imre Gellért (1888–1981), Hungarian gymnast
 Jay Gellert (born 1956), American CEO
 Lawrence Gellert (1898–1979), American music collector
 Rayna Gellert (born 1976), American fiddler
 Gellért Ivancsics (born 1987), Hungarian soccer player
 Gellert Tamas (born 1963), Swedish writer
 Saint Gellért, the name by which the Hungarian bishop Gerard Sagredo (980–1046) is commonly known

Other uses
 Gellert Grindelwald (1882–1998), a character from the Harry Potter franchise
 Gellért Hill, a hill in Budapest, Hungary
 Gellért Hill Cave, a cave in Gellért Hill which contains a church
 Gellért Hill Calvary, a Late Baroque calvary on Gellért Hill
 Hotel Gellért, a hotel in Budapest, Hungary
 Gellért Baths, baths at the hotel
 Geraltov (a village and municipality in the Prešov Region of eastern Slovakia

See also
 Gelert (disambiguation)